Stinking Water Creek is a stream in the U.S. state of South Dakota. It is a tributary of Little White River.

Stinking Water Creek's name comes from the Sioux Indians of the area, on account of the naturally occurring unpleasant odor along its course.

See also
List of rivers of South Dakota

References

Rivers of Bennett County, South Dakota
Rivers of Oglala Lakota County, South Dakota
Rivers of South Dakota